Frederick Field (born 1953) is an American business man. He is heir to Marshall Field who founded the Marshall Field and Company of department stores. He has investments in an entertainment company called Interscope Records.

1984 saw a consortium led by Field pay $52.5million for Panavision, the famous movie camera and lens manufacturer then based in Tarzana California.  Although the purchase was initially a management buyout of Panavision from Warner Communications, Field soon took full control of the company.  Then in 1987 Field sold Panavision for a considerable profit to a London based film services company Lee International PLC.  Lee paid Field $100 million for the camera manufacturer and they assumed liability for Panavision's debt which was around $47 million.

See also
List of billionaires

External links
Forbes.com: Forbes World's Richest People 

American businesspeople in retailing
1953 births
Living people

20th-century American businesspeople